The Philosophers' Magazine (TPM), an independent quarterly magazine founded in 1997, aims  to provide a venue for philosophy in an accessible and entertaining format. The founders were Julian Baggini and Jeremy Stangroom. The magazine includes articles, book reviews, interviews, and other content. TPM is edited by James Garvey, while Jeremy Stangroom edits its sister website, TPM Online. The magazine is distributed in the US and Canada by the Philosophy Documentation Center.

See also 
 List of philosophy journals

References

External links 

 The Philosophers' Magazine
 Philosophy Documentation Center

Quarterly magazines published in the United Kingdom
Independent magazines
Magazines established in 1997
Philosophy magazines
Public philosophy
Philosophy Documentation Center academic journals